Spring City is a borough in Chester County, Pennsylvania, United States. The population was 3,494 at the 2020 census. Spring City is a member of the Spring-Ford Area School District.

It is situated along the Schuylkill River, which divides Chester and Montgomery counties.  Directly across the river is the borough of Royersford.

Geography
Spring City is located at  (40.177866, -75.549828).

Transportation

No numbered highways serve Spring City directly. Main thoroughfares in the borough include Main Street, New Street and Bridge Street.

Demographics

At the 2010 census, the borough was 89.6% non-Hispanic White, 3.6% Black or African American, 0.1% Native American, 1.4% Asian, and 2.6% were two or more races. 3.4% of the population were of Hispanic or Latino ancestry .

At the 2000 census there were 3,305 people, 1,412 households, and 835 families in the borough. The population density was 4,321.9 people per square mile (1,679.0/km²). There were 1,508 housing units at an average density of 1,972.0 per square mile (766.1/km²).  The racial makeup of the borough was 95.25% White, 1.94% African American, 0.51% Native American, 1.03% Asian, 0.06% Pacific Islander, 0.27% from other races, and 0.94% from two or more races. Hispanic or Latino of any race were 1.18%.

There were 1,412 households, 28.6% had children under the age of 18 living with them, 42.8% were married couples living together, 11.4% had a female householder with no husband present, and 40.8% were non-families. 33.9% of households were made up of individuals, and 8.9% were one person aged 65 or older. The average household size was 2.33 and the average family size was 3.03.

The age distribution was 23.8% under the age of 18, 8.3% from 18 to 24, 34.9% from 25 to 44, 21.7% from 45 to 64, and 11.3% 65 or older. The median age was 36 years. For every 100 females there were 102.5 males. For every 100 females age 18 and over, there were 102.0 males.

The median household income was $40,601 and the median family income  was $52,292. Males had a median income of $36,866 versus $27,054 for females. The per capita income for the borough was $20,931. About 4.1% of families and 6.3% of the population were below the poverty line, including 7.4% of those under age 18 and 4.1% of those age 65 or over.

Notable people
Sherwood H. Hallman, a recipient of the United States military's highest decoration—the Medal of Honor—for his actions in World War II
Chuck Sheetz, Emmy Award-winning animation director for The Simpsons
Ham Wade, Major League Baseball player for the New York Giants

References

External links

Populated places established in 1867
Boroughs in Chester County, Pennsylvania